Nürnberg Rothenburgerstraße station, also rendered as Nürnberg Rothenburger Straße, is a railway station in the city of Nuremberg, in Bavaria, Germany. It is located on the standard gauge Nuremberg–Bamberg line of Deutsche Bahn. The station is connected to the Rothenburger Straße station of the Nuremberg U-Bahn.

Services
 the following services stop at Nürnberg Rothenburgerstraße:

References

External links
 
 

Railway stations in Nuremberg
Nuremberg S-Bahn stations